Alighiero Guglielmi (15 August 1912 - 1988) was an Italian racewalker.

Biography
Guglielmi was one of the most celebrated Italian racewalkers of the 1940s. Several times winner of the grueling 100 km walk, one of the most famous competition of the racewalking at the time. He did not participate in the Olympic Games only due to World War II, because those of Tokyo 1940 were suppressed, while at the time of Helsinki 1952 he was close to retirement at the age of 40.

National titles
Guglielmi won two titles at the national championships at individual senior level.
 Italian Athletics Championships
 50 km walk: 1940, 1942

References

External links
 Wikipedia dedica una pagina al campione di marcia calolziese Alighiero Guglielmi at Leccotoday.it 

1912 births
1988 deaths
Italian male racewalkers
Sportspeople from the Province of Alessandria
People from Alessandria
20th-century Italian people